Arturo Bragaglia (7 January 1893 – 21 January 1962) was an Italian actor. He appeared in more than one hundred films from 1938 to 1961.

Selected filmography

References

External links 

1893 births
1962 deaths
Italian male film actors
People from Frosinone